Hadrian Road is a Tyne and Wear Metro station, serving the town of Wallsend, North Tyneside in Tyne and Wear, England. It joined the network on 14 November 1982, following the opening of the fourth phase of the network, between Tynemouth and St James via Wallsend.

History
Unlike neighbouring Wallsend and Howdon, which were converted from former British Rail stations, Hadrian Road was purpose-built for the Tyne and Wear Metro in the early 1980s.

Facilities
Step-free access is available at all stations across the Tyne and Wear Metro network, with ramps providing step-free access to both platforms at Hadrian Road. The station is equipped with ticket machines, sheltered waiting area, seating, next train information displays, timetable posters, and an emergency help point on both platforms. Ticket machines are able to accept payment with credit and debit card (including contactless payment), notes and coins. The station is also fitted with smartcard validators, which feature at all stations across the network.

There is no dedicated car parking available at the station. There is the provision for cycle parking, with four cycle pods available for use.

Services
, the station is served by up to five trains per hour on weekdays and Saturday, and up to four trains per hour during the evening and on Sunday.

Rolling stock used: Class 599 Metrocar

References

External links
 
 Timetable and station information for Hadrian Road

Metropolitan Borough of North Tyneside
1982 establishments in England
Railway stations in Great Britain opened in 1982
Tyne and Wear Metro Yellow line stations
Transport in Tyne and Wear
